Jiaozhi Province was a province of the Chinese Ming dynasty that existed during its brief rule of northern Vietnam from 1407 to 1427, known in historiography as the Fourth Era of Northern Domination. The province's name, Jiaozhi, was an earlier Chinese name for northern Vietnam.

History
Hồ Quý Ly had violently taken the Trần throne and changed the country's name to Đại Ngu. When the Ming dynasty found out, they demanded that he reestablish the Trần dynasty, which he agreed to. However, the Hồ forces instead ambushed the Ming convoy escorting the Trần pretender, who was killed during the attack, and started harassing the Ming border.

After this, the Ming invaded Đại Ngu, destroyed the Hồ dynasty and began the Fourth Northern domination (1407–1427). The entire country became the Jiaozhi Province. 

The Ming dynasty crushed Lê Lợi's rebellion at first but indecisively. When Lê Lợi had rebuilt his force, the rebels defeated the Ming army on multiple occasions and tightened their siege of the province. Eventually, the Ming emperor accepted the de facto independence of the new kingdom. Later, when Lê Lợi offered to make his country a vassal of China, the Ming immediately declared him as king.

Lê Lợi dismissed all former administrative structures that the Ming implemented and divided the nation into 5 dao. The Ming formally abolished the Jiaozhi Province in 1428.

Administration
Jiaozhi Province was structured in the same manner as the 13 existing provinces of the Ming Empire. It was divided into 15 prefectures (府) and 5 independent prefectures (直隸州):

15 prefectures: Jiaozhou (交州), Beijiang (北江), Liangjiang (諒江), Sanjiang (三江), Jianping (建平, Kiến Hưng in Hồ dynasty), Xin'an (新安, Tân Hưng in the Hồ dynasty), Jianchang (建昌), Fenghua (奉化, Thiên Trường in the Hồ dynasty), Qianghua (清化), Zhenman (鎮蠻), Liangshan (諒山), Xinping (新平), Yanzhou (演州), Yian'an (乂安), Shunhua (順化). 
5 independent prefectures: Taiyuan (太原), Xuanhua (宣化, Tuyên Quang in the Hồ dynasty), Jiaxing (嘉興), Guihua (歸化), Guangwei (廣威)

Together with the 5 independent prefectures, there were other administrative divisions, which were under the normal prefectures. There were 47 divisions in total.

In 1408, the independent administrative divisions of Taiyuan and Xuanhua was promoted to a prefecture, which increased the number to 17. Afterwards, the Yanzhou prefecture was dismissed and its territory became an independent prefecture.

References

Bibliography

 

1428 disestablishments in Asia
15th-century disestablishments in China
Military history of the Ming dynasty
States and territories established in 1407
15th-century disestablishments in Vietnam
1407 establishments in Asia
15th-century establishments in China
15th-century establishments in Vietnam
Former commanderies of China in Vietnam